Calgary-Buffalo is a current provincial electoral district in Calgary, Alberta, Canada. The district is one of 87 districts mandated to return a single member (MLA) to the Legislative Assembly of Alberta using the first past the post method of voting. Calgary-Buffalo is currently represented by NDP MLA Joe Ceci.

The riding comprises primarily the downtown core of the city of Calgary. The riding has broad demographic diversity, and comprises the most transient population in Alberta.

The riding contains a mix of corporate office towers, luxury apartment buildings, Chinatown in the north part of the riding and lower income apartments in the south along the Beltline community. The Liberals have won this riding seven times, the Progressive Conservatives six, and the  New Democrats twice, while the Alberta Reform Movement was represented very briefly.

Due to the nature of the riding, candidates have a tougher time running a campaign, as traditional campaign methods — i.e., placement of lawn signs, door knocking, and voter identification — have proven to be of limited usefulness.

The riding was created in 1971, largely out of the old Calgary Centre riding and a small portion of the eastern part of Calgary West.

History
The electoral district was created in the 1971 boundary re-distribution out of parts of Calgary Centre, Calgary Victoria Park, and Calgary-West. The district has shifted boundaries many times over the years but has always covered the downtown core of Calgary. 

The 2010 Alberta electoral boundary re-distribution saw significant changes to the district, losing a huge portion of land to Calgary-Currie on the west boundary when it was cut from 37 Street to 14 Street SW. The East Village neighborhood and Fort Calgary were moved into Calgary-Fort on the west side and the south boundary was pushed from 17 Avenue into Lower Mount Royal to run along approximately 19 Avenue in land that used to be in Calgary-Currie. The electoral district would have a population of 40,381 in 2010, which was 1.2% below the provincial average of 40,880.

The 2017 Alberta electoral boundary re-distribution saw Calgary-Buffalo expand East into the communities of Ramsay and Inglewood. The boundaries as adjusted would give the electoral district a population of 49,907 in 2017, 7% above the provincial average of 46,803.

Boundary history

Representation history

The electoral district of Calgary-Buffalo was created in the boundary redistribution of 1971. The area it covered primarily consisted of three antecedent riding's Calgary Centre, Calgary Victoria Park and Calgary West. The riding primarily covers the City of Calgary's downtown core and belt line as well as some southwest inner city neighborhoods. The riding is one of Calgary's few swing ridings.

The Progressive Conservatives won the first election easily under Ron Ghitter who was later appointed to the Senate of Canada. The second member of the riding Tom Sindlinger who was elected in the 1979 general election. He was removed from the Progressive Conservative caucus on October 16, 1980 and sat as an Independent Conservative after calling for increased transparency with the Heritage Trust Fund.

Sindlinger formed the Alberta Reform Movement, a right wing party and became its leader on September 17, 1982. He was the first and only member of that party to form the Alberta Reform Movement caucus in the legislature. He was defeated in the 1982 general election in a landslide by Progressive Conservative Brian Lee.

Lee only held one term before being defeated by Liberal Sheldon Chumir in 1986. Chumir was re-elected with a landslide in 1989. He died on January 26, 1992. Liberal Gary Dickson won a by-election later that year and held the district for three terms before retiring.

The Progressive Conservatives won the seat back in 2001 with Harvey Cenaiko who was later given the cabinet portfolio of Solicitor General. He retired in 2008. Liberal candidate Kent Hehr won back the electoral district for his party in 2008. April 23, 2012, Kent Hehr was re-elected for a second term during the biggest percentage turnout of eligible voters since 1993. 2015 election, Kent Hehr decided to step up to the Federal Election which will be fall of 2015.

NDP candidate Kathleen Ganley won Calgary Buffalo for her party in the provincial election of 2015 for the first time. Joe Ceci was elected under the NDP banner in 2019 and is the current MLA.

Election results

Graphical Summary

1971 general election

1975 general election

1979 general election

1982 general election

1986 general election

1989 general election

1992 by-election

1993 general election

1997 general election

2001 general election

2004 general election

2008 general election

2012 general election

2015 general election

2019 general election

Senate nominee results

2004 Senate Nominee election district results

Voters had the option of selecting 4 Candidates on the Ballot

2012 Senate Nominee election district results

Plebiscite results

1971 Daylight Saving Plebiscite

Student Vote results

2004 election

On November 19, 2004 a Student Vote was conducted at participating Alberta schools to parallel the 2004 Alberta general election results. The vote was designed to educate students and simulate the electoral process for persons who have not yet reached the legal majority. The vote was conducted in 80 of the 83 provincial electoral districts with students voting for actual election candidates. Schools with a large student body that reside in another electoral district had the option to vote for candidates outside of the electoral district then where they were physically located.

2012 election

See also
List of Alberta provincial electoral districts

References

External links
Elections Alberta
The Legislative Assembly of Alberta
Riding Map for Calgary Buffalo

Alberta provincial electoral districts
Politics of Calgary